Wiedemannia astigmatica is a species of dance flies, in the fly family Empididae.

References

Wiedemannia
Insects described in 1937
Diptera of Europe
Taxa named by Aleksandr Stackelberg